Events in the year 1962 in Japan.

Incumbents 
Emperor: Hirohito
Prime minister: Hayato Ikeda (Liberal Democratic)
Chief Cabinet Secretary: Masayoshi Ōhira until July 18, Yasumi Kurogane
Chief Justice of the Supreme Court: Kisaburo Yokota
President of the House of Representatives: Ichirō Kiyose
President of the House of Councillors: Tsuruhei Matsuno until August 6, Yūzō Shigemune

Governors
Aichi Prefecture: Mikine Kuwahara 
Akita Prefecture: Yūjirō Obata 
Aomori Prefecture: Iwao Yamazaki 
Chiba Prefecture: Hitoshi Shibata (until 2 November); Hisaaki Kano (starting 2 November)
Ehime Prefecture: Sadatake Hisamatsu 
Fukui Prefecture: Eizō Kita 
Fukuoka Prefecture: Taichi Uzaki
Fukushima Prefecture: Zenichiro Satō 
Gifu Prefecture: Yukiyasu Matsuno 
Gunma Prefecture: Konroku Kanda 
Hiroshima Prefecture: Hiroo Ōhara (until 13 April); Iduo Nagano (starting 29 May)
Hokkaido: Kingo Machimura 
Hyogo Prefecture: Masaru Sakamoto (until 6 October); Motohiko Kanai (starting 24 November)
Ibaraki Prefecture: Nirō Iwakami 
Ishikawa Prefecture: Jūjitsu Taya 
Iwate Prefecture: Senichi Abe 
Kagawa Prefecture: Masanori Kaneko 
Kagoshima Prefecture: Katsushi Terazono 
Kanagawa Prefecture: Iwataro Uchiyama 
Kochi Prefecture: Masumi Mizobuchi 
Kumamoto Prefecture: Kōsaku Teramoto 
Kyoto Prefecture: Torazō Ninagawa 
Mie Prefecture: Satoru Tanaka 
Miyagi Prefecture: Yoshio Miura 
Miyazaki Prefecture: Hiroshi Kuroki 
Nagano Prefecture: Gon'ichirō Nishizawa 
Nagasaki Prefecture: Katsuya Sato 
Nara Prefecture: Ryozo Okuda 
Niigata Prefecture: Juichiro Tsukada
Oita Prefecture: Kaoru Kinoshita 
Okayama Prefecture: Yukiharu Miki 
Osaka Prefecture: Gisen Satō 
Saga Prefecture: Sunao Ikeda 
Saitama Prefecture: Hiroshi Kurihara 
Shiga Prefecture: Kyujiro Taniguchi 
Shiname Prefecture: Choemon Tanabe 
Shizuoka Prefecture: Toshio Saitō 
Tochigi Prefecture: Nobuo Yokokawa 
Tokushima Prefecture: Kikutaro Hara 
Tokyo: Ryōtarō Azuma 
Tottori Prefecture: Jirō Ishiba 
Toyama Prefecture: Minoru Yoshida 
Wakayama Prefecture: Shinji Ono 
Yamagata Prefecture: Tōkichi Abiko 
Yamaguchi Prefecture: Masayuki Hashimoto 
Yamanashi Prefecture: Hisashi Amano

Events 
May 3 - Mikawashima train crash - A freight train and two passenger trains collide near Mikawashima Station in Arakawa, Tokyo, resulting in 160 deaths.
May 17 - Dainippon Sumitomo Pharma halts the sale of the drug Thalidomide.
May 29 – Tobu Department Store in Tokyo-Ikebukuro was open. 
November 9 - An All Nippon Airways Vickers Viscount plane crashes in Aichi Prefecture while en route to Nagoya Airport, killing all 4 occupants of the aircraft.
November 18 - Two tankers, the smaller Munakata Maru 1 owned by Idemitsu Kosan and the larger Thrard Brovig, collide in the Keihin canal in Kawasaki City, Kanagawa Prefecture, causing the deaths of 40 crew members from both ships.
Unknown Date – Kotobuki Foods, as predecessor of Skylark (すかいらーく) Restaurant founded in Nishitokyo, Tokyo.

Births 
 January 20
 IKKO, make-up artist
 Sakiko Tamagawa, voice actress
 February 1 – Takashi Murakami, pop artist
 February 25 – Junko Ogata, serial killer
 March 10 – Seiko Matsuda, pop singer/songwriter
 March 13 – Shoko Sawada, singer-songwriter
 March 18 – Kazuhiro Mizoguchi, javelin thrower 
 March 30 – Yōko Ogawa, writer
 April 12 – Nobuhiko Takada, mixed martial arts fighter and professional wrestler
 April 30 – Seiji Maehara, politician
 May 5 – Kaoru Wada, composer
 May 31 – Noriko Hidaka, voice actress
 June 11 – Toshihiko Seki, voice actor
 June 18 – Mitsuharu Misawa, professional wrestler
 July 19 – Aya Kitō, writer (d. 1988)
 August 8 – Yūji Machi, voice actor
 August 21 – Tsutomu Miyazaki, serial killer (d. 2008)
 September 4 – Shinya Yamanaka, physician and researcher
 September 13 – Hisao Egawa, voice actor
 October 12 – Ko Matsushita, conductor
 October 15 – Yasutoshi Nishimura, politician 
 October 21 – Miki Itō, voice actress
 October 27 – Jun'ichi Kanemaru, voice actor
 November 14 – Atsuko Tanaka, voice actress
 November 27 – Marumi Shiraishi, actress
 December 1 – Shozo Hayashiya IX, rakugoka, tarento and voice actor
 December 23 – Keiji Mutoh, professional wrestler

Deaths 
 January 20 – Shizue Tatsuta, film actor (b. 1903).
 September 7 – Eiji Yoshikawa, writer and novelist (b. 1892)
 October 21 – Kinnosuke Ogura, mathematician, historian of mathematics (b. 1885)

See also
 List of Japanese films of 1962

References

 
Japan
Years of the 20th century in Japan
1960s in Japan
Japan